The Gorihorn (also known as Isentällispitz) is a mountain of the Silvretta Alps, located north of the Flüela Pass in the Swiss canton of Graubünden.

References

External links
 Gorihorn on Hikr

Mountains of the Alps
Mountains of Switzerland
Mountains of Graubünden
Two-thousanders of Switzerland